Michele Antonio Milocco (1690 - circa 1772)  was an Italian painter, of the late-Baroque period.

He worked mainly in the Piedmont. Among his works were frescoes painted in the King's chamber of the Palazzina di Caccia di Stupinigi (Royal Hunting Lodge at Stupinigi). He also collaborated with Claudio Beaumont of Turin in the decoration of the church of San Fillipo Neri in Fossano. He painted the dome of the small Vittone church of Santa Maria Maddalena, Alba.

References

1690 births
1772 deaths
18th-century Italian painters
Italian male painters
Italian Baroque painters
Painters from Piedmont
18th-century Italian male artists